Brent Hassert was a Republican member of the Illinois House of Representatives, representing the 85th district where he served from 1993 until January 2009. He served as Deputy House Republican Leader. 

Hassert was the owner of Hassert Landscaping. He was elected to the Will County Board in the 1988 general election. That year, he was part of a task force which spurred the adoption of the Solid Waste Planning and Recycling Act (PA 85-1198).

During the 2008 Republican Party presidential primaries, Hassert endorsed the presidential campaign of Rudy Giuliani. In his November 2008 bid for re-election, Hassert was defeated by Emily McAsey.

References

External links
Illinois General Assembly - Representative Brent Hassert (R) 85th District official IL House website
Bills Committees
Project Vote Smart - Representative Brent Hassert (IL) profile
Follow the Money - Brent Hassert
2006 2004 2002 2000 1998 1996 campaign contributions

Members of the Illinois House of Representatives
1952 births
Living people
People from Joliet, Illinois
21st-century American politicians
County board members in Illinois